The 2017 Super League season, known as the Betfred Super League XXII for sponsorship reasons, was the 22nd season of the Super League and 123rd season of rugby league in Britain. Twelve teams competed over 23 rounds, including the Magic Weekend, which took place at St James' Park, Newcastle upon Tyne, after which the eight highest entered the Super League play-offs for a place in the Super League Grand Final. The four lowest teams then entered the qualifying play-offs, along with the four highest teams from the Championship, to determine which teams will play again in Super League XXIII.

Super League XXII featured twelve teams, the third year in which this number has taken part. This was also the third year since promotion and relegation was reintroduced into the competition, seeing Leigh promoted and Hull KR relegated from last season.

Teams
Eleven teams in Super League are from the North of England. Six teams hail from the historic county of Lancashire, west of the Pennines: Warrington, St. Helens, Salford, Wigan, Leigh, and Widnes.  Five teams hail from the historic county of Yorkshire, east of the Pennines: Huddersfield, Wakefield Trinity, Leeds, Castleford, and Hull F.C. Catalans Dragons, located in Perpignan, France, are the only team outside the North of England. St Helens, Wigan Warriors, Warrington Wolves, and Leeds Rhinos are the only teams to have played in every season of Super League since 1996.

Leigh were promoted from the Kingstone Press Championship after finishing in 2nd place in The Qualifiers for 2016.  Leigh became the first club promoted to the Super League under the Super 8s system, and the first club promoted to Super League since Widnes received a license for Super League XVII.  Leigh last competed in the top flight in Super League X.  Hull Kingston Rovers were relegated to the Championship after losing the 2016 Million Pound Game to Salford.

Regular season

Standings at end of regular season

Super 8s

Format

After 23 games the league table was frozen and the teams were split up into 2 of the 5 "Super 8s". The teams finishing in the top 8 went on to contest the "Super League Super 8s" to determine which teams would go through to the semi-final play-offs to compete for a place in the Grand Final. Teams finishing in the bottom four (9-12) were put alongside the top 4 teams from the  Championship, in "The Qualifiers" Super 8 group, where these teams will reset their season standings to 0 and also play 7 extra games each, as they attempt to earn a place in the following Super League competition.

Castleford Tigers topped the Super League Super 8s and were awarded the League Leaders Shield as well as a home advantage in the play-off semi-finals.  The other home advantage was won by Leeds Rhinos with Hull and St Helens taking the other two places in the play-offs.

Results

Final standings

Playoffs

The Qualifiers

The Qualifiers

The Qualifiers sees the bottom 4 teams from Super League table join the top 4 teams from the Championship. The points totals are reset to 0 and each team plays 7 games each, playing every other team once. After 7 games each the teams finishing 1st, 2nd, and 3rd will gain qualification to the 2018 Super League season. The teams finishing 4th and 5th will play in the "Million Pound Game" at the home of the 4th place team which will earn the winner a place in the 2018 Super League. The loser, along with teams finishing 6th, 7th and 8th, will be relegated to the Championship.

Million Pound Game

Catalan's victory over Leigh ensured the continuation of Super League rugby in France for another season and meant Leigh were relegated to the Championship.

It also decided which four teams would enter the 2018 Challenge Cup at round 5 with the top three in the Qualifier and the winner of the Million Pound game forming the quartet.

Player statistics

Top try scorers

Top goalscorers

Top try assists

Top points scorers

Attendances

Average attendances

Top 10 attendances

 Statistics correct as of 23 July 2017 (round 23)

End-of-season awards

Awards are presented for outstanding contributions and efforts to players and clubs in the week leading up to the Super League Grand Final:

 Man of Steel: Luke Gale  -  Castleford Tigers
 Coach of the year: Daryl Powell -  Castleford Tigers
 Super League club of the year:  Castleford Tigers
 Young player of the year: Oliver Gildart -  Wigan Warriors
 Foundation of the year:  Wigan Warriors
 Rhino "Top Gun": Marc Sneyd -  Hull F.C. (89% - 103 goals)
 Metre-maker: Alex Walmsley -  St. Helens (4256 metres)
 Top Try Scorer: Greg Eden (38) -  Castleford Tigers
 Hit Man: Danny Houghton -  Hull F.C. (1123 tackles)
 Outstanding Contribution:Thomas Bosc -  Catalans DragonsChris Bridge -   Warrington WolvesRob Burrow -  Leeds RhinosEorl Crabtree -   Huddersfield GiantsGareth Ellis -  HullAndy Lynch -  Castleford TigersLeon Pryce -  Bradford BullsIafeta Paleaaesina -  Hull

Media

Television
2017 is the first of a five-year contract with Sky Sports to televise 100 matches per season.

Sky Sports coverage in the UK will see two live matches broadcast each week, usually at 8:00 pm on Thursday and Friday nights.

Regular commentators will be  Eddie Hemmings with summarisers including Phil Clarke, Brian Carney, Barrie McDermott and Terry O'Connor. Sky will broadcast highlights on Sunday nights on Super League - Full Time at 10 p.m.

BBC Sport will broadcast a highlights programme called the Super League Show, presented by Tanya Arnold. The BBC show two weekly broadcasts of the programme, the first to the BBC North West, Yorkshire, North East and Cumbria, and East Yorkshire and Lincolnshire regions on Monday evenings at 11:35 p.m. on BBC One, while a repeat showing is shown nationally on BBC Two on Tuesday afternoons at 1.30 p.m. The Super League Show is also available for one week after broadcast for streaming or download via the BBC iPlayer in the UK only. End of season play-offs are shown on BBC Two across the whole country in a weekly highlights package on Sunday afternoons.

Internationally, Super League is shown live or delayed on Showtime Sports (Middle East), Sky Sport (New Zealand), TV 2 Sport (Norway), Fox Soccer Plus (United States), Fox Sports (Australia) and Sportsnet World (Canada).

Radio

BBC Coverage:

 BBC Radio 5 Live Sports Extra (National DAB Digital Radio) will carry two Super League commentaries each week on Thursday and Friday nights (both kick off 8pm); this will be through the 5 Live Rugby league programme which is presented by Dave Woods with a guest summariser (usually a Super League player or coach) and also includes interviews and debate..
 BBC Radio Humberside will have full match commentary of all Hull F.C. matches.
 BBC Radio Leeds carry commentaries featuring Leeds, Castleford, Wakefield and Huddersfield.
 BBC Radio Manchester will carry commentary of Leigh, Wigan and Salford whilst sharing commentary of Warrington with BBC Radio Merseyside.
 BBC Radio Merseyside will have commentary on St Helens and Widnes matches whilst sharing commentary of Warrington with BBC Radio Manchester.

Commercial Radio Coverage:

 102.4 Wish FM will carry commentaries of Wigan & St Helens matches.
 107.2 Wire FM will carry commentaries on Warrington Home and Away.
 Radio Yorkshire will launch in March carrying Super League commentaries. 
 Radio Warrington (Online Station) all Warrington home games and some away games.
 Grand Sud FM covers every Catalans Dragons Home Match (in French).
 Radio France Bleu Roussillon covers every Catalans Dragons Away Match (in French).

All Super League commentaries on any station are available via the particular stations on-line streaming.

References

External links
Official Site
BBC Rugby League